Max Turner (9 October 1911 – 24 May 1960) was a former Australian rules footballer who played with Collingwood in the Victorian Football League (VFL).

Notes

External links 

		
Max Turner's profile at Collingwood Forever

1911 births
1960 deaths
Australian rules footballers from Victoria (Australia)
Collingwood Football Club players